Rani Chandramani Devi Government Hospital is a children's hospital located at Pedda Waltair, Visakhapatnam, India.

History
The site of the hospital was donated by the Queen of Chemudu in the year of 1965 as per her will. The hospital was started with 20 beds, later expanded to 100 beds.

Biodiversity park 
The Biodiversity park as the Rani Chandramani Devi Government Hospital is maintained by Dolphin Nature Conservation Society
 in collaboration with Visakhapatnam Metropolitan Region Development Authority and RCD Government Hospital Development Committee. The park was established in the year 2002 and houses over 2000 species of plants. It extends over an area of 3 acres with 10 major sections: medicinal & aromatic, living fossils from Jurassic era, insectivorous, orchids, cacti & succulents, sacred groves, ferns, aquatic, bamboo & palm groves and ornamental. It has many botanical curiosities like Pitcher plant, Mickey Mouse, Krishna's butter cup, Holy cross, Jesus smile, Upside-down tree, Autograph, James Bond 007 pipe, Laughing Buddha and also rare plants like Ginkgo biloba.
More than 100 species of butterflies are reported from this garden. The garden provides salubrious climate and mental relaxation to the patients of the hospital.

See also
King George Hospital
Government Victoria Hospital

References

Hospital buildings completed in 1965
Hospitals in Visakhapatnam
Children's hospitals in India
1965 establishments in Andhra Pradesh
20th-century architecture in India